A special election was held in  on November 2, 1804 to fill a vacancy left by the resignation of William Hoge (DR) on October 15, 1804.

Election results 

John Hoge, the winner of this special election, was the brother of the outgoing incumbent William Hoge, and took his seat November 27, 1804

See also 
 List of special elections to the United States House of Representatives

References 

Pennsylvania 1804 10
Pennsylvania 1804 10
1804 10
Pennsylvania 10
United States House of Representatives 10
United States House of Representatives 1804 10